Annona ambotay is a species of tree in the Annonaceae family. It is native to South America.

References

ambotay
Trees of Peru
Trees of Bolivia
Trees of Colombia
Trees of Ecuador
Trees of Brazil
Trees of Guyana
Trees of French Guiana
Trees of Suriname
Trees of Venezuela
Plants described in 1775